Sablatnig was a German aircraft manufacturer and airline. After the conclusion of World War I, in August 1919 Sablatnig offered government subsidised services between Berlin and Bremen using its Sablatnig P.III commercial biplanes in conjunction with Norddeutscher Lloyd.

Aircraft

References

 
Defunct aircraft manufacturers of Germany